Baron Loránd Eötvös de Vásárosnamény (or Loránd Eötvös, ; 27 July 1848 – 8 April 1919), also called Baron Roland von Eötvös in English literature, was a Hungarian physicist.  He is remembered today largely for his work on gravitation and surface tension, and the invention of the torsion pendulum.

In addition to Eötvös Loránd University
and the Eötvös Loránd Institute of Geophysics in Hungary,
the Eötvös crater on the Moon,
the asteroid 12301 Eötvös and the mineral lorándite
also bear his name, as well as peak (Cime Eotvos) in the Dolomites.

Life
Born in 1848, the year of the Hungarian revolution, Eötvös was the son of the Baron József Eötvös de Vásárosnamény (1813–1871), a well-known poet, writer, and liberal politician, who was cabinet minister at the time, and played an important part in 19th century Hungarian intellectual and political life. His mother was the Hungarian noble lady Agnes Rosty de Barkócz (1825–1913), member of the illustrious noble family Rosty de Barkócz that originally hailed from the Vas county, and through this, he descended from the ancient medieval Hungarian noble Perneszy family, which died out in the 18th century. Loránd's uncle was Pál Rosty de Barkócz (1830–1874) was a Hungarian nobleman, photographer, explorer, who visited Texas, New Mexico, Mexico, Cuba and Venezuela between 1857 and 1859.

Loránd Eötvös first studied law, but soon switched to physics and went abroad to study in Heidelberg and Königsberg. After earning his doctorate, he became a university professor in Budapest and played a leading part in Hungarian science for almost half a century. He gained international recognition first by his innovative work on capillarity, then by his refined experimental methods and extensive field studies in gravity.

Eötvös is remembered today for his experimental work on gravity, in particular his study of the equivalence of gravitational and inertial mass (the so-called weak equivalence principle) and his study of the gravitational gradient on the Earth's surface. The weak equivalence principle plays a prominent role in relativity theory and the Eötvös experiment was cited by Albert Einstein in his 1916 paper The Foundation of the General Theory of Relativity. Measurements of the gravitational gradient are important in applied geophysics, such as the location of petroleum deposits. The CGS unit for gravitational gradient is named the eotvos in his honor.

From 1886 until his death, Loránd Eötvös researched and taught in the University of Budapest, which in 1950 was renamed after him (Eötvös Loránd University).

Eötvös is buried in the Kerepesi Cemetery in Budapest, Hungary.

Torsion balance
A variation of the earlier invention, the torsion balance, the Eötvös pendulum, designed by Hungarian Baron Loránd Eötvös, is a sensitive instrument for measuring the density of underlying rock strata. The device measures not only the direction of force of gravity, but the change in the force of gravity's extent in the horizontal plane. It determines the distribution of masses in the Earth's crust. The Eötvös torsion balance, an important instrument of geodesy and geophysics throughout the whole world, studies the Earth's physical properties. It is used for mine exploration, and also in the search for minerals, such as oil, coal and ores. The Eötvös pendulum was never patented, but after the demonstration of its accuracy and numerous visits to Hungary from abroad, several instruments were exported worldwide, and the richest oilfields in the United States were discovered by using it. The Eötvös pendulum was used to prove the equivalence of the inertial mass and the gravitational mass accurately, as a response to the offer of a prize. This equivalence was used later by Albert Einstein in setting out the theory of general relativity.

This is how Eötvös describes his balance:

One of Eötvös' assistants who later became a noted scientist was Radó von Kövesligethy.

Honors
To honor Eötvös, a postage stamp was issued by Hungary on 1 July 1932. Another stamp was issued on 27 July 1948 to commemorate the centenary of the birth of the physicist.
Hungary issued a postage stamp on 31 January 1991.

See also
 Eotvos, a unit of gravitational gradient
 List of geophysicists
 Lorándite, a mineral named after Loránd Eötvös

References

Further reading

External links

 Eötvös and STEP (biographical remarks and a summary of his research)
 Eötvös Loránd Virtual Museum

1848 births
1919 deaths
Scientists from Budapest
19th-century Hungarian physicists
Academic staff of Eötvös Loránd University
Fluid dynamicists
Education ministers of Hungary
Members of the Hungarian Academy of Sciences
Burials at Kerepesi Cemetery
Geophysicists